Lina Engren (born 13 February 1977) is a Swedish bobsledder. She competed in the two woman event at the 2002 Winter Olympics.

References

External links
 

1977 births
Living people
Swedish female bobsledders
Olympic bobsledders of Sweden
Bobsledders at the 2002 Winter Olympics
Sportspeople from Stockholm
20th-century Swedish women